The Great Seal of Ontario is a governmental seal used to authenticate documents issued by the Canadian Government of Ontario that are released in the name of the King in Right of Ontario, including the appointment of the Executive Council and Ministers (the Cabinet).

Design
In the centre of the Great Seal is the shield from the royal coat of arms of the United Kingdom (representing the link to Britain), with a Tudor Crown above and the armorial shield of Ontario below. Several borders surround these symbols, including the words "The Seal of the Province of Ontario" in English only.

A sculpture of the Great Seal is carved above the main entrance to the Ontario legislature at Queen's Park.

History

The Great Seal has been used since January 1, 1870, following the appointment through a Royal Warrant by Queen Victoria. The keeper of the Great Seal is the Lieutenant Governor of Ontario, but the Minister of Government and Consumer Services maintains day-to-day custody of the seal.

The current seal replaced the Great Seal of the Province of Canada, used from 1841 to 1867, under the 136th clause of the British North America Act, 1867. This former seal was carved on an interior wall of the House of Commons of Canada in Ottawa in 1953. Before 1841, the Great Seal of Upper Canada had been in use since 1792.

See also
Symbols of Ontario
Great Seal of Canada
Great Seal of Quebec

References

Great Seal of Ontario – Lieutenant Governor of Ontario
Emblems and Symbols of Ontario

Ontario, Great Seal of
Provincial symbols of Ontario
Monarchy in Canada